Live In Japan is a Primal Scream live album. It was released in 2003 for the Japanese market only. All were tracks recorded at Zepp Tokyo in 2002.

Track listing
 "Accelerator"
 "Miss Lucifer"
 "Rise"
 "Shoot Speed/Kill Light"
 "Pills"
 "Autobahn 66"
 "City"
 "Rocks"
 "Kowalski"
 "Swastika Eyes"
 "Skull X"
 "Higher Than the Sun"
 "Jailbird"
 "Movin' on Up"
 "Medication"
 "Born to Lose"

Personnel

Primal Scream
Bobby Gillespie – vocals, percussion, guitar
Andrew Innes – guitar
Robert Young –  guitar
Martin Duffy – keyboards, programming, samples, effects
Gary 'Mani' Mounfield – bass
Darrin Mooney – drums

Additional musicians
Kevin Shields - guitar, effects, keyboards

External links

Live in Japan at YouTube (streamed copy where licensed)

References

2003 live albums
Albums recorded at Zepp Tokyo
Primal Scream albums